Makin' Memories may refer to:
 Makin' Memories (album), a 1969 album by Dottie West
 "Makin' Memories" (song), a song by the Sherman Brothers
 "Making Memories", a song originally recorded by Frankie Laine in 1967